Anita Arturivna Serogina (born 16 January 1990, in Chornomorsk) is a Ukrainian karateka competing in the kumite 61 kg division.

Career
She won the gold medal in the women's 61 kg event at the 2022 World Games held in Birmingham, United States. She is also a 2017 World Games medalist, World and European championships medalist.

She won the gold medal in the women's kumite 61 kg event at the 2019 European Games held in Minsk, Belarus. In the final she defeated Tjaša Ristić of Slovenia.

In 2021, she qualified at the World Olympic Qualification Tournament held in Paris, France to compete at the 2020 Summer Olympics in Tokyo, Japan. She competed in the women's 61 kg event. In November 2021, she won the silver medal in the women's 61 kg event at the 2021 World Karate Championships held in Dubai, United Arab Emirates.

Achievements

References

External links
 Anita Serogina at Sports Committee of Ukraine
 Anita Serogina at Ukrainian Karate Federation
 
 
 

Living people
1990 births
Ukrainian female karateka
European champions for Ukraine
World Games medalists in karate
World Games gold medalists
World Games silver medalists
Competitors at the 2017 World Games
Competitors at the 2022 World Games
European Games medalists in karate
Karateka at the 2019 European Games
European Games gold medalists for Ukraine
Karateka at the 2020 Summer Olympics
Olympic karateka of Ukraine
People from Chornomorsk
Sportspeople from Odesa Oblast
21st-century Ukrainian women